The Ukrainian Male Chorus of Edmonton (UMCE) was founded in 1984 in Edmonton, Alberta, Canada, and has performed at many events and festival both in Canada and internationally. Performances include Expo '86, the International Choral Festival, along with tours to Ukraine, Poland, and Eastern Europe. Each year the UMCE hosts a Christmas concert, A Festive Mosaic. A Festive Mosaic is hosted by the UMCE and hosts several different groups each year, including soloists, duos, and other choirs from the Edmonton region. The concert is usually held at McDougall United Church. The UMCE is also a member of the Alberta Choral Federation (ACF). The UMCE has also performed numerous times with the Edmonton Symphony Orchestra (ESO) at the Winspear Centre in downtown Edmonton.

The current conductor of the choir is Orest Soltykevych.

Discography
The UMCE has released four recordings, That Old Sheepskin Coat (1992), The Ukrainian Male Chorus of Edmonton LIVE! (2002), Malanka Suite (2006), and Kateryna (2007).

Tours

References

External links
 Ukrainian Male Chorus of Edmonton Official Website
 Alberta Choral Federation Website

Canadian choirs
Musical groups established in 1984
Ukrainian-Canadian culture
1984 establishments in Alberta